Kovačić is a South Slavic surname.

Kovačić may also refer to:

Kovačić, Bosnia and Herzegovina, a village in the municipality of Livno
Kovačić, Croatia, a village in the city of Knin

See also
Kovač (disambiguation)
Kovači (disambiguation)
Kovačići (disambiguation)
Kovačica (disambiguation)
Kovačice, a village
Kovačina, a village
Kovačevo (disambiguation)
Kovačevac (disambiguation)
Kovačevci (disambiguation)
Kovačevići (disambiguation)
Kováčová (disambiguation)
Kováčovce, a village